The 1941 Morris Brown Wolverines football team was an American football team that represented Morris Brown College in the Southern Intercollegiate Athletic Conference (SIAC) during the 1941 college football season. In their tenth, non-consecutive season under head coach Billy Nicks, the team compiled a 11–1 record, defeated  in the Peach Blossom Bowl and Langston in the Vulcan Bowl, and outscored all opponents by a total of 219 to 55.  The Morris Brown team was recognized as the 1941 black college national co-champion.

Schedule

References

Morris Brown
Morris Brown Wolverines football seasons
Black college football national champions
Morris Brown Wolverines football